Amiran is a village in Isfahan Province, Iran.

Amiran may also refer to:
 Amiran-e Olya, Chaharmahal and Bakhtiari Province
 Amiran-e Sofla, Chaharmahal and Bakhtiari Province
 Amiran, Hormozgan
 Amiran Amirkhanov (born 1985), Armenian basketball player
 Amiran David (Horst Kallner; 1910–2003), German and Israeli geoscientist